E. Raffles and Co. was a large clothing and textile factory in the mid-20th century in Ancoats, Manchester. Founded by Emanuel Raffles, it employed as many as a thousand workers. The factory occupied part of Brunswick Mill at 2 Bradford Road, Manchester as well as the neighbouring EMKA Works towards Beswick Road (now mostly demolished). Raffles had cutting rooms in the upper section of Brunswick Mill where the pattern cut cloth was fed by carousel and conveyor to the sewing rooms in the lower section of the adjacent building. The Raffles family sold the business in the 1970s and it closed in the early 1980s.

The kindness of Emanuel, known as 'Old Man Raffles' is referred to in Jeanette Winterson's book 'Why Be Happy When You Could Be Normal?'. The book also mentions the high quality of clothing produced at Raffles, enabling it to become the main supplier of raincoats to Marks & Spencer.

Emanuel Raffles was one of the founders of Manchester's Whitefield Golf Club in 1932, set up as a reaction to the anti-semitism of most other golf clubs but open to non-Jews. His sons Ralph and Eric both worked at the factory. Ralph, married to the daughter of Marks & Spencer's Edward Sieff, was appointed High Sheriff of Greater Manchester. Eric, a keen aviator, commuted between Heathrow and Manchester Ringway in the 1960s and early 1970s in his private aircraft.

References 
'Why Be Happy When You Could Be Normal?', Jeanette Winterson, 2011, pub. Jonathan Cape,

External links 
https://www.flickr.com/photos/suemcloughlin/2408230868/ Factory Sign on derelict wall E Raffles and Co ca. 2005
http://www.heritage-explorer.co.uk/web/he/searchdetail.aspx?id=8417&start=1&crit=fireproof&large=1 Photo Brunswick mill ca.2002
 Brunswick Mill, Ancoats
http://www.abpic.co.uk/photo/1003703/ Eric Raffles Beech Baron plane Heathrow 1970
http://www.writeoutloud.net/profiles/carminegrimshaw CG, born in Ancoats, memory of the Raffles Factory (1978–1980)
https://www.flickr.com/photos/74784995@N00/6331859763/sizes/o/in/photostream/ Poem 'Mills of Ancoats' by CG (Carmine Grimshaw)
http://menmedia.co.uk/manchestereveningnews/news/s/1031822_flamboyant_fundraiser_raffles_dies10037
http://www.thejc.com/lifestyle/lifestyle-features/36719/why-its-rough-times-jewish-golf-club*

Defunct companies based in Manchester
Manufacturing companies based in Manchester